Bernard Assiniwi (pseudonym: "Chagnan" born July 31, 1935 in Montreal; died September 4, 2000) was a writer of French-Canadian, Cree & Algonquin Extraction. In addition to that he was a researcher in Aboriginal History, a producer, and an actor. One of his best known works is La Saga des Béothuks or The Beothuk Saga in the English translation by Wayne Grady.

Biography 
Bernard Assiniwi was born on July 31, 1935 and died on 4 September 2000. Son of Églantine Bleau and Joseph-Leonidas Zephirin Lapierre, from Algonquin, Cree and Quebecois heritage. As a child he spoke Cree but French was the language of his schooling.

He graduated from the University of Guelph, obtaining a BScA in animal science.

He went on to follow a variety of careers. He was involved with the beginning of the cultural section of the Department of Indian Affairs and Northern Development from 1965 to 1968. In 1965, he also appeared in the film "La vie heureuse de Léopold Z". Other film appearances were "Les smattes" (1972) and "Les forges de Saint-Maurice" (1973). He also served as curator of the Easter Subarctic Cultural area of the Canadian Museum of Civilization until his death in 2000.

From 1968, Assiniwi published over 30 books, as well as writing journal articles, and writing and producing for radio, theater and film. He is considered an important contributor to Canadian Literature from a French Canadian Indigenous perspective, paving the way for other Indigenous authors to follow. In 1971, he was one of the first Indigenous authors to write a French language work that was largely read throughout Québec (Anish-nah-be: Contes adultes du pays algonkin, published by Leméac), For this book, he received a mention in the Prix littéraire de la Ville de Montréal. Assiniwi went to work for Leméac, from 1972 à 1976, as a director. In 1999, The University of Québec and Trois-Rivières bestowed upon Bernard Assiniwi an honorary doctorate for his literary contributions.

Bernard Assiniwi married Marina Assiniwi and they had three sons : Marc-André Assiniwi, Christian Assiniwi and Jean-Yves Assiniwi.

Benard Assiniwi died at age 65, from a heart attack following heart surgery.

In 2001 Land Insights created the prix Dr. Bernard-Chagnan-Assiniwi, awarded for the first time in 2001 to Indigenous artists or creators whose work had contributes to their original culture.

Awards 
He won the Jean-Hamelin literature prize for French and Quebecois authors in 1997. He as also shortlisted for the Governor General prize of Canada in the same year.  Assiniwi's Pre-Recruit Training Camp (1993) was awarded a Bronze Plaque (best screenplay) at the 41st Columbus Film Festival.

Published works

References

External links
 Fonds Bernard Assiniwi (R377) at Library and Archives Canada.
 Assiniwi, life and work at kwahiatonhk (in French)

Academics from Montreal
Male actors from Montreal
Writers from Montreal
Cree people
1935 births
2000 deaths
First Nations academics